The UNC Greensboro Spartans are the athletic teams that represent the University of North Carolina at Greensboro in Greensboro, North Carolina. They compete in the Southern Conference in all sports.

History
The intercollegiate athletics program at the University of North Carolina at Greensboro reaches as far back as the late 1940s during the days of the WCUNC, with students participating in national golf tournaments in 1948 and the school hosting the national tournaments for women's golf (1954) and tennis (1965). During the 1980s, all Spartan teams competed in Division III (non-scholarship) and then Division II (scholarship) of the National Collegiate Athletic Association (NCAA), and all teams have competed in Division I since Fall 1991. UNC Greensboro is a three-time winner of the Sasser Cup.

Teams
A member of the Southern Conference, UNC Greensboro sponsors teams in eight men's and nine women's NCAA sanctioned sports:

Although not considered official sports teams, the Athletic Department also includes the UNCG Cheerleading Squad and the UNCG Dance Team, the Spartan Gs. The college's only college football team plays at the club level, in the South Atlantic Conference of the National Club Football Association.

National championships
UNCG has won 5 national championships. All five were won while at the Division III level of the NCAA.
 Men's Soccer – 1982*, 1983*, 1985*, 1986*, 1987*

(*) NCAA Division III

Achievements

Baseball

In his freshman year, Danny Valencia played third base and was the 2004 Southern Conference Freshman of the Year, and was voted second-team All-Conference.

On April 18, 2006, UNCG earned its first win over a top-ranked team in any sport during the university's Division I era.  The baseball team defeated top-ranked North Carolina, 7–6, in front of a crowd of 1,835.  After jumping out to a 4–1 lead, UNCG withstood several Tar Heel rallies, including a pair of runs in the top of the ninth inning before closer Patrick Currin closed the door.

The baseball team plays its home games at UNCG Baseball Stadium.

Men's basketball
On March 2, 1996, men's basketball knocked off Liberty, 79–53, to claim the Big South Tournament Championship and advance to the NCAA Tournament for the first time in Division I. The Spartans lost to Cincinnati in the NCAA Tournament, 66–61. The five seniors from the team had their numbers honored. Scott Hartzell finished his career as the men's basketball's all-time leading scorer with 1,539.

On March 4, 2001, the men's basketball team won its first Southern Conference championship on David Schuck's buzzer-beating layup. The team went on to play top-ranked Stanford in the first round of the NCAA Tournament, its second trip to the "Big Dance" in five years. Guard Nathan Jameson was named first-team Verizon Academic All-America.

On December 31, 2005, UNCG hosted top-ranked Duke at the Greensboro Coliseum in front of a record crowd of 21,124. The near capacity crowd was the largest to ever see a UNCG athletic event.

On December 5, 2008, it was announced that UNCG would be moving their home games to the Greensboro Coliseum for the 2009–2010 season.

Women's basketball
In December 2005, UNCG's women's basketball program enjoyed two of its greatest non-conference wins since moving to the Division I level. In a 12-day span, UNCG knocked off Big East foe West Virginia at home and ACC member Wake Forest on the road. It was UNCG's first-ever win over a Big East school and the program's first victory over Wake Forest since 1977.

In March 2006, the UNCG women's basketball team made its first SoCon Tournament title game appearance since 2002. The Spartans rallied from nearly all of a 21-point deficit, closing to within three in the final four minutes. However, Chattanooga pulled away late for a 91–79 win.

There is a student organization dedicated to cheering on the Spartans in all of their athletic events called the Blue Crew.   The Blue Crew adds an  excitement to games and makes every team feel unwelcomed with a sea of blue/yellow tie dyed shirts and loud cheers.

Men's soccer
1989: Defeated in the NCAA Division II Men's Soccer Championship by New Hampshire College (now Southern New Hampshire University). This would be the Spartans' only appearance in the Division II championship. 
1991: UNCG Soccer Stadium, a $3.6 million facility, opened for its first game on September 7, as the men's team defeated Campbell, 3–1. Four days later, the Spartans stunned No. 2 NC State, 2–1.
1997: SoCon Regular Season Champions.
1998: SoCon Regular Season Champions.
2004: Was ranked #1 in the country for 11 weeks. SoCon Regular Season Champions. The UNCG's Men's Soccer team lost in the Sweet 16 of the NCAA Tournament to UC-Santa Barbara's Men's Soccer team, 1–0 in Overtime. 
2005: SoCon Regular Season Champions.  SoCon Tournament Champions.  The UNCG's Men's Soccer team advanced to the Sweet 16 of the NCAA Tournament to which they lost at SMU 1–3.
2006: Socon Regular Season Champions.  SoCon Tournament Champions.  Once again advanced to the Sweet 16 of the NCAA Tournament and lost to Northwestern 1–2.
2007: Advanced to the SoCon Tournament Championship game and lost to Furman in Overtime.
2008: Went into the SoCon Tourny as the #7 seed. They shocked the conference by winning the SoCon Championship being the lowest seed to ever win the championship. During their unbelievable run, the Spartans knocked off Duke in the first round of the NCAA tournament, Loyola (MD) in overtime in the second round, and were the first team to make it to the final 16 of the NCAA tournament with a losing record.

Women's soccer
1997: SoCon Regular Season Champions and SoCon Tournament Champions.
1998: SoCon Regular Season Champions and SoCon Tournament Champions.
2000: SoCon Tournament Champions.
2001: SoCon Regular Season Champions and SoCon Tournament Champions.
2004: SoCon Regular Season Champions.
2006: SoCon Regular Season Champions and SoCon Tournament Champions.
2007: SoCon Regular Season Champions and SoCon Tournament Runner up.
2008: SoCon Regular Season Champions and SoCon Tournament Runner up.
2017: SoCon Tournament Champions. 
2018: SoCon Tournament Champions.

Hall of fame
The university established an athletic hall of fame in 2000. The hall of fame honors those athletes, coaches, and people whose outstanding contributions have enriched the athletic programs of The University of North Carolina at Greensboro.

Athletic Director
Nelson E. Bobb (1983–2009)
Kim Record (2009–2021)
Brian Mackin (2022–present)

References

External links